Casey Patrick Kelly (born October 4, 1989) is an American professional baseball pitcher for the LG Twins of the KBO League. He was a first-round draft choice, 30th overall, in the 2008 Major League Baseball Draft by the Boston Red Sox. Kelly was the top minor league prospect in the Red Sox organization when he was acquired by the San Diego Padres after the 2010 season, along with three other prospects, in exchange for All-Star player Adrián González. He made his Major League Baseball (MLB) debut with San Diego in 2012, but underwent Tommy John surgery the following year. Kelly was traded to the Atlanta Braves after the 2015 season. He has also pitched for the San Francisco Giants.

Professional career

Draft
Kelly was drafted in the first round, 30th overall, in the 2008 Major League Baseball Draft by the Boston Red Sox. He was drafted as a pitcher, though he wanted to play shortstop. Kelly was also offered a scholarship to play football for the University of Tennessee, as he was a two-time regional player of the year as a quarterback at Sarasota High School.  Kelly chose baseball over football and signed with the Red Sox for a $3 million signing bonus, $700,000 more than the sixth player in the draft received.

Boston Red Sox
Kelly played the first half of the 2009 season with the Greenville Drive and Salem Red Sox as a pitcher. He was elected to the All-Star Futures Game. He finished the second half of season as a shortstop. On December 8, 2009, Kelly announced his decision to continue his career as a full-time pitcher. He had hit .222 while striking out 27 percent of the time, while he had a 6–1 record with a 1.12 ERA pitching with Class A Greenville.

Kelly played for the Double-A Portland Sea Dogs in 2010, posting a 5.31 ERA in 21 starts.  In 2010 mid-season minor league prospect rankings, Kelly was ranked #10 by ESPN and #24 by Baseball America.

San Diego Padres
On December 6, 2010, Kelly was traded along with Anthony Rizzo, Reymond Fuentes, and Eric Patterson to the San Diego Padres for three-time All-Star first baseman Adrián González. Kelly was considered the top prospect in the Red Sox organization.  Entering the 2011 season, he was ranked 22  among the Top 50 Prospects by MLB.com. The Padres invited Kelly as a non-roster player to their Major League camp for 2011 Spring Training. The top prospect in the Padres' Minor League system, Kelly opened the 2011 regular season in Double-A with the San Antonio Missions.  He put up a 3.98 ERA with 105 strike-outs in 27 starts and 142 innings with San Antonio.

Kelly strained his elbow in his second start for Triple-A Tucson in April 2012. He started his rehabilitation with the rookie-league Arizona League Padres in July and then started three games for San Antonio. He was promoted to the Major Leagues to replace the injured Jason Marquis in San Diego's starting rotation.  Kelly earned a win after pitching six shutout innings in a 3–0 victory over the Atlanta Braves in his Major League debut on August 27, 2012. He also recorded his first major league hit in the game. Kelly was the 15th different starting pitcher used by the Padres in 2012, which ties a club record.  Kelly made six starts for the Padres in 2012, going 2–3 with a 6.21 ERA.

On March 22, 2013, it was announced that Kelly had micro tears in his UCL. He underwent Tommy John surgery on April 2 and was placed on the team's disabled list.  He began throwing again in September and was still considered a premium prospect coming into 2014.

Kelly came back from injury in 2014 but only appeared in a couple of starts in the minors. In 2015, Kelly was converted into a reliever, appearing in 20 games, 6 starts in AA before being called up to the El Paso Chihuahuas, the Padres AAA minor league affiliate.

Atlanta Braves
On December 10, 2015, the Padres traded Kelly and Ricardo Rodriguez to the Atlanta Braves for Christian Bethancourt. Kelly was assigned to the Triple-A Gwinnett Braves, and recalled to the major leagues on April 20, 2016. Three days later, he was optioned to Gwinnett. Kelly was recalled once again in May to make his first start with the Braves, giving up three runs in five innings in a 5–0 loss to the Philadelphia Phillies. On July 2, 2016, he was optioned to AAA Gwinnett. Kelly was outrighted on November 2, 2016.

Chicago Cubs
On January 27, 2017, Kelly signed a minor league deal with the Chicago Cubs and was invited to spring training. He was released in July.

San Francisco Giants
On July 29, 2017, Kelly signed a minor league deal with the San Francisco Giants. He elected free agency on November 6, 2017. He re-signed, to a minor league deal with the Giants on February 25, 2018. Kelly was called up to relieve and start for the major league team in mid-August, due to other pitchers' injuries. In seven games (three starts), he went 0–3 with an ERA of 3.04 over  innings.

LG Twins
On November 20, 2018, Kelly signed to a one-year, $1 million deal with the LG Twins of the KBO League for the 2019 season. He re-signed for the 2020 season on a $1.5 million contract. On December 10, 2020, Kelly re-signed with the Twins for the 2021 season on a $1.4MM contract. On December 12, 2021, Kelly re-signed with the Twins for the 2022 season on a $1.2 million deal. On December 2, 2022, Kelly re-signed a one-year contact for the 2023 season worth $1.8 million.

Awards
 2008 Louisville Slugger Pre-Season High School First Team All-American
 Mr. Baseball Florida 2008
 Florida 6A Player of the Year 2008
 Red Sox ML Pitcher of the Month (April 2009)
 Carolina League Player of the Week (June 1–7, 2009)
 South Atlantic League All-Star (2009)
 Futures Game All-Star (2009)
 Carolina League Player of the Week (June 22–28, 2009)
 2009 Red Sox Minor League Pitcher of the Year
 2010 Portland Sea Dogs Pitcher of the Year

Personal life
Kelly's father, Pat Kelly appeared in three major league games as a catcher. Kelly made his major league debut in 2012, on his father's 57th birthday.

See also

List of second-generation Major League Baseball players

References

External links

 MiLB Profile

1989 births
Living people
American expatriate baseball players in South Korea
Sarasota High School alumni
Sportspeople from Sarasota, Florida
Baseball players from Florida
Major League Baseball pitchers
KBO League pitchers
San Diego Padres players
Atlanta Braves players
San Francisco Giants players
LG Twins players
Gulf Coast Red Sox players
Lowell Spinners players
Salem Red Sox players
Greenville Drive players
Salem Avalanche players
Portland Sea Dogs players
San Antonio Missions players
Tucson Padres players
Arizona League Padres players
Mesa Solar Sox players
Peoria Javelinas players
Lake Elsinore Storm players
El Paso Chihuahuas players
Gwinnett Braves players
Iowa Cubs players
Sacramento River Cats players